Mesocondyla is a genus of moths of the family Crambidae described by Julius Lederer in 1863.

Species
Mesocondyla dardusalis (Walker, 1859)
Mesocondyla tarsibarbalis Hampson, 1899

References

Spilomelinae
Crambidae genera
Taxa named by Julius Lederer